The Mikvé Israel-Emanuel Synagogue, in Willemstad, Curaçao, is the oldest surviving synagogue in the Americas. It is commonly known as the Snoa (short for esnoga, an old Portuguese and Judaeo-Spanish word for synagogue) and is a major tourist attraction in Curaçao, with one notable group of visitors including Queen Beatrix of the Netherlands and her family, in 1992.

The community (congregation Mikvé Israel) dates from the 1650s, and consisted of Spanish and Portuguese Jews from the Netherlands and Brazil. In the nineteenth century there was a breakaway Reform community (Emanu El); the two merged to form the present community in 1964. The community is now affiliated with Reconstructionist Judaism.

The first synagogue building was purchased in 1674; the current building dates from 1730. One visitor to the synagogue observed, upon entering through a quiet courtyard, viewing the azure stained glass windows and walking across a sand covered floor toward the carved mahogany Holy Ark that the sand floors remind congregants "of how its Jewish ancestors on the Iberian peninsula covered the floors of their makeshift prayer houses so that their footsteps would be muffled and the suspicion of potential denouncers would not be aroused." With its three high vaulted ceilings, the Holy Ark and the pulpit, the galleries, the benches and the chandeliers, the interior of the synagogue bears a marked resemblance to the Portuguese Synagogue in Amsterdam. Attached to the synagogue is the Jewish Historical Cultural Museum, whose collection includes replicas of artistic tombstones from the Beit Chaim Bleinheim in Curaçao, the oldest Jewish cemetery still in use in the Western Hemisphere.

The other Royal Dutch island in the Caribbean with a historical synagogue is Sint Eustatius, where the ruins of the Honen Dalim synagogue of 1739 still stand on the Synagogepad. An even older synagogue existed at Jodensavanne, Suriname, Beracha ve Shalom ("Blessings and Peace"), built between 1665 and 1671. Unlike the Curaçao synagogue, however, these other synagogues are no longer in use.

See also
 Oldest synagogues in the world#South America and Caribbean
 Portuguese Synagogue (Amsterdam)

References

Synagogues in Curaçao
Sephardi Jewish culture in the Caribbean
Sephardi Jewish culture in the Netherlands
Sephardi Reform Judaism
Sephardi synagogues
Spanish and Portuguese Jews
Reconstructionist synagogues in North America
18th-century synagogues
Buildings and structures in Willemstad